Jelgava Gymnasium or Academia Petrina is the oldest higher educational establishment in Latvia. The duke wanted to attract professors like Immanuel Kant and Johan Gottfried Herder, but they refused.

After the partitions of the Polish–Lithuanian Commonwealth, Jelgava became part of the Russian Empire and the gymnasium unsuccessfully petitioned to become a university. Nevertheless, it became an important cultural hub not only for Latvians, but also Lithuanians.

During World War I, the school was evacuated to Taganrog in Rostov Oblast while its 42,000-volume library was burned by troops of Pavel Bermondt-Avalov. During World War II, the historical school building was almost completely destroyed, therefore school was reestablished in new premises. The original building was later restored and now functions as the  Jelgava History and Art Museum.

Name
 1775 Academia Petrina
 Gymnasium Petrinum
 since 1837: official name in German Gouvernements-Gymnasium
 1934 to 1940: Hercoga Pētera ģimnāzija (Herzog-Peter-Gymnasium)
 after 1945: Jelgavas 1. vidusskola (Jelgavan Secondary School Nr. 1)
 15. August 1991: 1. Gymnasium
 2012: Jelgavas Tehnoloģiju vidusskola (Technical Secondary School Jelgava)

History
The establishment of the academy was based on an idea by Friedrich Wilhelm von Raison: "But the whole province owes him excellent thanks for the effective part, which he took at the foundation of the Mitauian Gymnasium. He was actually the one who persuaded Duke Peter to do so; it was he who corresponded with Sulzern regarding the plan to be drawn up and because of the appointment of the first teachers and he who prescribed the books for the library and the instruments for the observatory; just as he also continuously participated in the perfection of the institute until his death". 

The intention was to establish a complete university with all four faculties in Mitau. This plan was rejected because of Kurland's dependence on Catholic-Polish rule. Under the law of Poland a university could not be founded without the consent and confirmation of the Pope, and it was unclear whether and when the permission by the papal curia to establish a Protestant theological faculty could have been obtained. Therefore, this intention was abandoned and it was decided to found an academic gymnasium which - half school, half university - should enjoy all the rights of a university, with the exception of the privilege of granting academic dignity.

People

Notable students

Teachers

References

External links
 Official website

1775 establishments in Europe
Schools in Latvia
18th-century establishments in Latvia
Duchy of Courland and Semigallia